Andre Fitzgerald Jones (May 15, 1969 – June 22, 2011) was an American football linebacker who played for one season in the National Football League in 1992 for the Detroit Lions. He played college football at Notre Dame, and was drafted by the Pittsburgh Steelers in the seventh round of the 1991 NFL Draft. He died in 2011 due to a brain aneurysm.

Personal life
He had five children, including three sons: T. J., Malachi, and Jahmai.  T. J. is a wide receiver, Malachi is a wide receiver for the Montreal Alouettes of the Canadian Football League (CFL), and Jahmai is a Outfielder for the Los Angeles Angels

References

1969 births
2011 deaths
African-American players of American football
African-American players of Canadian football
American expatriate sportspeople in Canada
American football defensive ends
American football linebackers
Canadian football linebackers
Deaths from intracranial aneurysm
Detroit Lions players
Pittsburgh Steelers players
Players of American football from Washington, D.C.
Notre Dame Fighting Irish football players
Winnipeg Blue Bombers players
20th-century African-American sportspeople
21st-century African-American people
Neurological disease deaths in Georgia (U.S. state)